Tommy Wood may refer to:
 Tommy Wood (motorcyclist)
 Tommy Wood (footballer)

See also
 Tom Wood (disambiguation)
 Tom Woods (disambiguation)